Rhys Lewis may refer to:

 Rhys Lewis (novel)
 Rhys Lewis (born 1532), MP for New Radnor Boroughs October 1553 and 1558
 Rhys Lewis (1571 MP), MP for New Radnor Boroughs 1571
 Rhys Lewis (musician), British musician born in 1993